Diapori is an island that almost touches the coast of Crete, near Geropotamos, in Rethymno regional unit. The islet is not visible on many maps but can be seen on satellite images.

See also
List of islands of Greece

References

Landforms of Rethymno (regional unit)
Uninhabited islands of Crete
Islands of Greece